Stan Ghițescu (June 2, 1881 – February 25, 1952) was a Romanian politician.

Born in Mârzănești, Teleorman County, he attended a normal school and entered Alexandru Averescu's People's Party. He served as mayor of Roșiorii de Vede from 1920 to 1921. In 1926, he was elected vice president of the Assembly of Deputies. He later joined Octavian Goga's National Agrarian Party, which subsequently merged with the National-Christian Defense League to form the National Christian Party. He became general secretary of the new party, and while Goga was Prime Minister from December 1937 to March 1938, served as Minister of Cooperation. He took part in the 1938 formation of the National Renaissance Front, the sole party under King Carol II. He served as Minister of Labor in two cabinets during the summer of 1940: under Ion Gigurtu from July 4 to September 4, and under Ion Antonescu from September 4 to 14, until the establishment of the National Legionary State. Arrested under the new communist regime, he was sent to Sighet Prison in May 1950, dying there nearly two years later. He was buried in a mass grave.

Notes

References
Stelian Neagoe, Istoria guvernelor României. Bucharest: Editura Machiavelli, 1999.

External links

1881 births
1952 deaths
People from Teleorman County
Mayors of places in Romania
People's Party (interwar Romania) politicians
20th-century Romanian politicians
Members of the Chamber of Deputies (Romania)
Romanian Ministers of Labor
Inmates of Sighet prison
Prisoners who died in Securitate custody
Romanian people who died in prison custody